Paradise Cave is a horizontal karstic limestone cave located inside the Malik hill, to the south of Kielce, Świętokrzyskie Voivodship, Poland.

It is part of the "Red tourist trail Chęciny - Kielce" in the Świętokrzyskie Mountains (Holy Cross Mountains).

Description 
Despite its small size it is regarded as one of Poland's most beautiful caves and attracts numerous visitors. Its corridors lead through five chambers and caverns, that are ornamented with speleothems, such as stalactites, stalagmites and columns of calcified rock deposited over tens of thousands of years. In front of the entrance is an info center illuminated by optical fiber, that exhibits the cave's archeological and paleontological discoveries that include a replica of a Neanderthal camp, Mousterian assemblages and fossilized bones of contemporary Paleolithic fauna.

Archaeology

History
The cave was discovered in 1963 by Józef Kopeć and Feliks Wawrzeńczak, students of a local technical school. After extensive research and documentation by Tymoteusz Wróblewski and Zbigniew Rubinowski, geologists at the Świętokrzyskie branch of the Polish Geological Institute it was opened to the public in 1972.

Discoveries
The five chambers of the cave were formed during the Middle Devonian epoch, approximately 350 million years ago. Inside, there are traces of occupancy by Neanderthal dating back 50 to 60 thousand years. Remains and fossils of Cave hyena and cave bear, that inhabited the cave and countless bones of mammalian species, such as Woolly rhinoceros and mammoths were unearthed at the site.

References

External links 

 Official homepage
 Photo gallery 
 Jaskinia Raj  – with a map

1963 archaeological discoveries
Show caves in Poland
Raj
Landforms of Świętokrzyskie Voivodeship
Tourist attractions in Świętokrzyskie Voivodeship
Archaeological sites in Poland
Mousterian
Neanderthal sites
Devonian Europe